Postmodern Vertigo is a description of a panic that occurs when somebody considers the reality of their own existence but no longer accepts truth or structure in their thought.  Suddenly the thinker no longer believes in anything, everything seeming like a fabrication. Thought becomes meaningless and a feeling akin to vertigo is experienced.  Many writers have described this feeling as "the void" or as a "crisis of postmodernism".  Another term which has a similar meaning is anomie.  Whereas a crisis of postmodernism describes the thought or meaning of viewing existence as a false construct and the void creates a metaphoric representation and anomie refers to the philosophical dead end, Post-modern vertigo more specifically has been used to refer to this feeling when it takes on a physiological manifestation, causing an increase in heart rate and sweating.

Postmodern vertigo might be a form of existential crisis.

References 
"Panic Encyclopaedia" Arthur and Marilouise Kroker
"Death at the Parasite Cafe" Stephen Pfoh.

External links 
 https://archive.today/20130218035527/http://foucault.info/Foucault-L/archive/msg06659.shtml

Postmodernism